Eisenhorn: Xenos is a third-person science-fiction action-adventure game produced and developed by Pixel Hero Games. Set in the Warhammer 40,000 universe, it is based on the novel Xenos, the first book of the Eisenhorn trilogy by Dan Abnett. It was scheduled for release on May 19, 2016, but was ultimately pushed back to August. It was released on Steam for PC on 10 August 2016.

Plot
The gameplay centers around the Inquisition that moves amongst mankind like an avenging shadow, striking down the enemies of humanity with complete ruthlessness. Imperial inquisitor Gregor Eisenhorn (voiced by Mark Strong) faces a vast interstellar cabal and the dark power of daemons, all racing to recover an arcane text of supreme and abominable power — an ancient tome known as the Necroteuch.

Reception

Eisenhorn: Xenos received "generally unfavorable" reviews for Microsoft Windows and "mixed or average" reviews for iOS.
The game's graphics, combat system and controls were criticized; in addition, it was hard for some players to understand the plot without knowledge of the original novel.

References

2016 video games
Action-adventure games
IOS games
Android (operating system) games
Video games set on fictional planets
Warhammer 40,000 video games
Windows games